Nedol Saleh is a former Lebanon international rugby league footballer who represented Lebanon at the 2000 World Cup.

Background
Saleh was born in Australia.

Playing career
Since then Saleh has played for a variety of clubs in Australia, including the Appin Dogs in 2008 and the Campbelltown City Kangaroos in 2010 in the Group 6 Rugby League competition.

References

Living people
Year of birth missing (living people)
Australian rugby league players
Lebanon national rugby league team players
Rugby league hookers